Spilarctia adumbrata is a moth in the family Erebidae. It was described by Thomas in 1994. It is found on Sumatra.

References

Moths described in 1994
adumbrata